Oksusu-cha or corn tea is a Korean tea made from corn. While oksusu-suyeom-cha or corn silk tea refers to the tea made from corn silk, oksusu-cha can be made from corn kernels, corn silk, or a combination of both. The caffeine-free infusion is a popular hot drink in winter. Along with bori-cha (barley tea), oksusu-cha is one of the free grain teas served in many restaurants in place of water.

In Gangwon Province, the tea is called gangnaengi-cha—gangnaengi is a Gangwon dialect for "corn"—and is consumed throughout late autumn and winter in most households.

Preparation 
Traditionally, corn kernels are dried and roasted to prepare oksusu-cha. The roasted corn kernels are then boiled in water until the tea turns yellow. The tea is then strained and the boiled corn discarded. Although the drink is naturally sweet, sugar is sometimes added when a sweeter flavor is desired.

Roasted corn kernels are available at groceries, traditional markets and supermarkets in Korea, as well as at Korean groceries abroad. Tea bags containing ground corn are also commercially available.

Blends 
Oksusu-cha is often combined with bori-cha (barley tea), as the corn's sweetness offsets the slightly bitter flavor of the barley.

Gallery

See also 
 Bori-cha – barley tea
 Hyeonmi-cha – brown rice tea
 Memil-cha – buckwheat tea
 Roasted grain beverage

References 

Herbal tea
Korean tea
Maize-based drinks